Kendal Vickers  (born May 3, 1995) is an American football defensive tackle for the Buffalo Bills of the National Football League (NFL). He played college football at Tennessee.

Early years
Vickers played high school football at Havelock High School.

College career
Vickers played at the University of Tennessee from 2013–2017 under head coach Butch Jones.

Professional career

Pittsburgh Steelers
Vickers was signed by the Pittsburgh Steelers as an undrafted free agent on April 28, 2018. He was waived on August 31, 2018, as part of final roster cuts.

Tennessee Titans
Vickers was signed by the Tennessee Titans to their practice squad on December 24, 2018, but was released on January 7, 2019.

Edmonton Eskimos
Vickers was signed by the Edmonton Eskimos of the Canadian Football League (CFL) on May 19, 2019. He recorded 12 tackles with two sacks during the season. Vickers was released by Edmonton on January 20, 2020, to allow him to pursue NFL opportunities.

Las Vegas Raiders
Vickers signed a reserve/futures contract with the Las Vegas Raiders on January 22, 2020. He made the Raiders' 53-man roster out of training camp. Vickers made his NFL debut on September 13, 2020, against the Carolina Panthers, playing nine snaps on defense and one snap on special teams in the Week 1 victory. He was placed on the reserve/COVID-19 list by the team on November 18, and activated three days later. In Week 15 against the Los Angeles Chargers on Thursday Night Football, Vickers recorded his first career sack on Justin Herbert during the 30–27 overtime loss.

Vickers signed a one-year contract extension with the Raiders on March 2, 2021. He was waived on August 31, 2021, and re-signed to the practice squad the next day. He was promoted to the active roster on November 10.

On December 6, 2022, Vickers was released by the Raiders.

Buffalo Bills
On December 8, 2022, Vickers was signed to the Buffalo Bills practice squad. He was released on December 21. He signed a reserve/future contract on January 9, 2023.

References

External links

Tennessee Volunteers bio

1995 births
Living people
Players of American football from North Carolina
American football defensive ends
Tennessee Volunteers football players
Las Vegas Raiders players
Pittsburgh Steelers players
Tennessee Titans players
Edmonton Elks players
Buffalo Bills players
People from Havelock, North Carolina